Nogliksky District is an administrative district (raion) of Sakhalin Oblast, Russia; one of the seventeen in the oblast. Municipally, it is incorporated as Nogliksky Urban Okrug. It is located in the northeast of the Island of Sakhalin. Its administrative center is the urban locality (an urban-type settlement) of Nogliki. Population:  The population of Nogliki accounts for 84.4% of the district's total population.

References

Notes

Sources

Districts of Sakhalin Oblast